Anne Margaret Wright  (born 26 July 1946) is a British academic and academic administrator.

She was educated at King's College London (BA English, 1967; PhD, 1970). She was a Lecturer in English at Lancaster University from 1969 to 1971 then Senior Lecturer in Modern English at Hatfield Polytchnic (now the University of Hertfordshire) from 1971 to 84. She served as Vice Chancellor of the University of Sunderland from 1992 to 1998. She was Chair of the National Lottery Commission 2005 to 2013. She was made a CBE in 1997.

References

1946 births
Living people
Alumni of King's College London
Academics of Lancaster University
Vice-Chancellors by university in England
People associated with the University of Sunderland
Commanders of the Order of the British Empire
Place of birth missing (living people)
Women academic administrators